James Christopher Bolam  (born 16 June 1935) is an English actor. He is best known for his roles as Terry Collier in The Likely Lads and its sequel Whatever Happened to the Likely Lads?, Jack Ford in When the Boat Comes In, Roy Figgis in Only When I Laugh,  Trevor Chaplin in The Beiderbecke Trilogy, Arthur Gilder in Born and Bred, Jack Halford in New Tricks and the title character of Grandpa in the CBeebies programme Grandpa in My Pocket.

Early life
Bolam was born on 16 June 1935 in Sunderland, County Durham, England. His father, Robert Alfred Bolam, was from Northumberland, and his mother, Marion Alice Drury, from County Durham. After attending Bede Grammar School, Sunderland, Bolam attended Bemrose School in Derby. Bolam trained as an articled clerk to chartered accountant, before becoming an actor, and formally trained at the Central School of Speech and Drama, London, where he won the gold medal and the Margaret Rawlings Cup.  Lacking funding for his fees, he worked in Lyons Corner House tearoom and West End restaurants, washing dishes, at night and studied during the day.

Bolam's first professional engagement was at the Royal Court Theatre as an understudy to Ronnie Barker in Chekhov's "Platonov".    He first appeared on screens in the early 1960s, initially in television shows such as Z-Cars and the Northern social realist films A Kind of Loving and The Loneliness of the Long Distance Runner (both 1962), in the latter film as the best friend of the title character (played by Tom Courtenay).

It was The Likely Lads, with Bolam as Terry Collier and Rodney Bewes as Bob Ferris, which made Bolam a star during its 1964 to 1966 run, and he adapted the scripts for a BBC Radio version soon afterwards. He appeared with John Thaw in the Granada serial, Inheritance in 1967.

Before the sequel, Whatever Happened to the Likely Lads?, began its run, Bolam appeared in films such as Half a Sixpence (1967), Otley (1969), and O Lucky Man! (1973). The revived series, chronicling the further adventures of Bob and Terry, lasted for two series broadcast in 1973 and 1974 and a 45-minute 1974 Christmas Eve special.

In 1975, Bolam appeared alongside the original cast in a further BBC Radio series adapted from the 1973 TV series and in 1976 there was a further reunion in a feature film spin-off from the series, simply entitled The Likely Lads. Bolam's co-star Rodney Bewes stated in 2005 that the two actors had not spoken since the film had been made, a period of over thirty years. The rift, according to Bewes, developed through his indiscreetly telling a journalist that when Bolam's wife revealed she was pregnant, Bolam was so startled that the car he was driving mounted a pavement and almost crashed into a lamp post. Bolam denied there was a rift between the two men when Bewes died in November 2017.

Bolam is known for being guarded about his private life. He once remarked: "I'm having a man fix the track rods on my car. I don't want to know anything about him. Why should he want to know anything about me?"

In 1976, Bolam returned to straight drama, as Jack Ford in the BBC Television series When the Boat Comes In, which ran until 1981. Since then he has mostly appeared in comedies and comedy dramas, including Only When I Laugh (as Roy Figgis) from 29 October 1979 to 16 December 1982, The Beiderbecke Affair (as Trevor Chaplin) in 1985, The Beiderbecke Tapes in 1987, Andy Capp (in the title role), The Beiderbecke Connection in 1988, Second Thoughts (as Bill MacGregor) from 3 May 1991 to 14 October 1994, Midsomer Murders, Pay and Display, Dalziel and Pascoe, Close and True, Born and Bred (as Dr Arthur Gilder), and New Tricks (as Jack Halford). Another memorable role was alongside Timothy West and Sheila Hancock in the 2002 series of the BBC comedy-drama Bedtime, in which Bolam played the seemingly decent but actually crooked Ronnie Stribling.

On radio, in 1978 he played Willie Garvin in a BBC World Service radio adaptation of the Modesty Blaise book Last Day in Limbo. He provided the voice for The Tod in the animated film version of The Plague Dogs (1982). In the mid-1980s, he co-starred in the original radio version of the romantic sitcom Second Thoughts, which ran for several series and was subsequently adapted for television with Bolam reprising his role. In the year 2000 he played Sir Archibald Flint in the Doctor Who audio play The Spectre of Lanyon Moor. He was also the narrator for the three-part football documentary Three Lions, which aired before Euro 2000 on BBC One. The three episodes were about England's National Team's history from the 1966 World Cup until before the Euro 2000 finals.

In 2002, Bolam played the serial killer Harold Shipman in Shipman, the ITV adaptation of Brian Masters' book on the case, Prescription for Murder b and Father Leonard Tibbings in Dalziel and Pascoe (Ser. 7, Ep. 1 'Sins of the Fathers'). He portrayed Harold Wilson, the former Prime Minister, in the 2006 BBC documentary The Plot Against Harold Wilson. He appeared in Frank Loesser's musical How to Succeed in Business Without Really Trying at the Chichester Festival Theatre during the 2005 summer season. He played the role of Grandpa in the Cbeebies show Grandpa in My Pocket. In 2009 he played Ken Lewis, CEO of the Bank of America, in the television dramatisation The Last Days of Lehman Brothers.

His appearances on the London stage include Jeffrey Bernard is Unwell by Keith Waterhouse and Ben Elton's play, Gasping.  In 1974, he appeared in a novel production of 'Macbeth' at The Young Vic, in which the lead role was shared by Bolam and two other actors. It was announced on 20 September 2011, that Bolam had quit the role of Jack Halford in New Tricks, just days after two more series were commissioned.

Bolam continues to work in the theatre as well as on television. During spring 2015, he appeared in the play Bomber's Moon by William Ivory at the Park Theatre, Finsbury Park, London.

Personal life
Bolam lives in Wisborough Green, West Sussex and Chiswick, London, with his wife, the actress Susan Jameson (who co-starred with him in an early episode of The Likely Lads, the TV series and "New  Tricks". Bolam also appeared in When the Boat Comes In, Close and True and Grandpa in My Pocket). They have a daughter. Bolam plays golf and is a member of the Stage Golfing Society.

In March 1977, Bolam was Roy Plomley's guest on Desert Island Discs, where he picked as his favourite track, the "Violin Concerto in D" by Ludwig van Beethoven, as his book The Lord of the Rings by J. R. R. Tolkien, and as his luxury, "selected cases of French wine". In the show, he expressed an ambition to appear in a Western, and referred to his enjoyment of horses and having been a race-horse owner.

Bolam appeared in a 2014 video protesting against oil drilling near Wisborough Green.

Bolam sings top tenor in the Wisborough Green barber shop choir. The choir is a small local group that  performs at fetes and small venues (The Right Notes Nov. 1995). 

Bolam was appointed Member of the Order of the British Empire (MBE) in the 2009 Birthday Honours "For services to Drama."

TV credits

Selected filmography
 The Kitchen as Michael (1961)
 A Kind of Loving as Jeff (1962)
 H.M.S. Defiant as Midshipman Assisting in Operation (1962)
 The Loneliness of the Long Distance Runner as Mike (1962)
 Murder Most Foul as Bill Hanson (1964)
 Otley as Albert (1968)
 Crucible of Terror as John 'Jack' Davies (1971)
 Straight on till Morning as Joey (1972)
 O Lucky Man! as Attenborough / Examination Doctor (1973)
 In Celebration as Colin (1975)
 The Likely Lads as Terry Collier (1976)
 The Plague Dogs as The Tod (voice only) (1982)
 Clash of Loyalties as A. T. Wilson (1983)
 Seaview Nights as Merlin (1994)
 Clockwork Mice as Wackey (1996)
 Stella Does Tricks as Mr. Peters (1996)
 The Barber (1997)
 The Island on Bird Street as Doctor Studjinsky (1997)
 The End of the Affair as Mr. Savage (1999)
 It Was an Accident as Vernon Fitch (2000)
 To Kill a King as Denzil Holles (2003)

References

External links

1935 births
Living people
20th-century English male actors
21st-century English male actors
Alumni of the Royal Central School of Speech and Drama
Actors from County Durham
Male actors from Tyne and Wear
British male comedy actors
English male film actors
English male musical theatre actors
English male television actors
Members of the Order of the British Empire
People educated at Bemrose School
People from Sunderland
People from Wisborough Green